The Vlahna mine is a large mine located in northern Albania in Bulqizë County,  north-east of the capital, Tirana. Vlahna represents the second largest chromium reserve in Albania and one of the largest in Europe having estimated reserves of 2.56 million tonnes of ore grading 29.2% chromium metal.

The Vlahna mine began operating in 1986. The total combined chromium ore production from the mine between 1986 and 2006 amounted to 45,000 tonnes. The chromium ore reserves of the mine are split into two categories above and below Profile 16. The proven ore reserves located above the Profile 16 amount to 2,560,000 tonnes of ore grading 29.2% chromium metal. The proven ore reserves located below the Profile 16 are currently not estimated or calculated but are expected to be grading 38% chromium metal. The mine's total reserves amount to 2.56 million tonnes of ore grading 29.2% chromium metal. The southern part of the mine is owned by private investors and the central and northern part of the mine is unoccupied. The Vlahna mine is one of the eight Albanian chromium mines to have reserves of over 1 million tonnes of chromium ore.

References 

Chromium mines in Albania
Underground mines in Albania
Kukës